Leptomyrina hirundo, the tailed black-eye, is a butterfly of the family Lycaenidae. It is found from South Africa to the coast of eastern Kenya and Malawi. In South Africa it is found in warm wooded savannah from the Eastern Cape to coastal KwaZulu-Natal and inland in riverine forest to Swaziland, Mpumalanga and Limpopo.

The wingspan is 19–24 mm for males and 19.5–26 mm for females. Adults are on wing year round in warmer areas with peaks in November and March.

The larvae feed on Kalanchoe, Crassula, Byrophyllum and Cotyledon species.

References

Butterflies described in 1857
Hypolycaenini
Lepidoptera of South Africa
Lepidoptera of Kenya
Lepidoptera of Mozambique
Lepidoptera of Malawi
Insects of Eswatini